Future's Gold is an album by saxophonist Ricky Ford which was recorded in 1983 and released on the Muse label.

Reception

The AllMusic review by Scott Yanow stated "What makes this outing by tenor saxophonist Ricky Ford a bit different than his previous ones is that in addition to the fine trio, Larry Coryell is an important voice on the record, playing electric guitar on the first four songs and acoustic 12-string guitar on the remaining four tunes. Ford, a vastly underrated but talented tenorman, contributes six originals ... An excellent record, it is recommended both for the contributions of Ford and the surprisingly versatile Coryell".

Track listing
All compositions by Ricky Ford except where noted
 "A-Flat Now" – 4:39
 "You Don't Know What Love Is" (Gene de Paul, Don Raye) – 5:56
 "Samba de Caribe" – 4:30
 "Goodbye, Pork Pie Hat" (Charles Mingus) – 3:15
 "Future's Gold" – 3:55
 "Knowledge" – 6:11
 "Centenarian Waltz" – 4:45
 "Hindsight and Necessity" – 4:31

Personnel
Ricky Ford - tenor saxophone
Larry Coryell – electric guitar, twelve-string guitar
Albert Dailey – piano 
Ray Drummond – bass 
Jimmy Cobb – drums

References

Muse Records albums
Ricky Ford albums
1983 albums
Albums recorded at Van Gelder Studio
Albums produced by Michael Cuscuna